Vikas Singh Saini (born 2 July 1996) is an Indian professional footballer who plays as a defender for I-League club Gokulam Kerala.

Club career
Saini began his career as part of the youth team at then I-League club East Bengal. He then moved to Mohun Bagan and played for the club in the Calcutta Football League. He then joined BSS Sporting Club before joining I-League 2nd Division side Hindustan. Prior to the 2019–20 season, Saini joined Mohammedan before re-signing with East Bengal in May 2020.

Churchill Brothers
In January 2021, Saini joined I-League club Churchill Brothers. He made his debut for the club on 14 January 2021 against Mohammedan, starting in the club's 0–0 draw.

Gokulam Kerala
on 15th September saini joined I-League club Gokulam Kerala.

Career statistics

Club

References

1996 births
Living people
People from South Goa district
Indian footballers
Footballers from Goa
Association football forwards
East Bengal Club players
Mohun Bagan AC players
Hindustan FC players
Mohammedan SC (Kolkata) players
Churchill Brothers FC Goa players
Calcutta Football League players
I-League players
Gokulam Kerala FC players